Macquartiini is a tribe of flies in the family Tachinidae.

Genera
Anthomyiopsis Townsend, 1916
Macquartia Robineau-Desvoidy, 1830

References

Muscomorph flies of Europe
Brachycera tribes
Tachininae